Gangneung Yeongdong College is a private technical college in Seongsan-myeon, a rural area of Gangneung city in northeastern South Korea.  It takes its name from the Yeongdong region, in which it is located.

Campus

There are twelve major buildings on the campus, which covers an area of 113,000 square metres.

History

The school officially opened on June 1, 1963, as Gangneung Superior Technical School of Nursing (강릉간호고등기술학교).  It had a maximum enrollment of 90 students.  Enrollment was raised to 120 in 1966, and doubled to 240 in 1971.  It was redesignated a technical college in 1973.

Organization

As a technical college, the school provides courses of study of two or three years in length.  Two-year courses are provided by the Divisions of Health (departments of Optometry and Beauty), Hospitality, Social Service and Industry.  Three-year courses are provided by the Divisions of Health, Nursing, and Social Service (department of early childhood education).

Students and faculty

Entering classes now average about 1,500 students, of which more than 90% study in regular daytime classes.  The remainder attend night school.

See also
List of universities and colleges in South Korea
Education in South Korea

External links

Official college website, in English

Universities and colleges in Gangwon Province, South Korea
Nursing schools in South Korea
Gangneung
Educational institutions established in 1963
1963 establishments in South Korea